Nir Yitzhak (Yitzhak's Meadow) is a kibbutz in the northwestern Negev desert of Israel. Located between Hevel Shalom and Hevel Eshkol, it falls under the jurisdiction of Eshkol Regional Council.

History
The kibbutz was established on 8 December 1949, and like Mashabei Sadeh, was named for Palmach commander Yitzhak Sadeh.  It is affiliated with the Hashomer Hatzair youth movement. The kibbutz hosts the Garin Tzabar program, a framework for non-Israeli Jews who volunteer to serve in the Israel Defense Forces. Shahen Agriculture Co. is a field crop production company jointly owned by Kibbutz Nir Yitzhak and Kibbutz Kerem Shalom.

References

External links
Official website 

Kibbutzim
Kibbutz Movement
Populated places established in 1949
Gaza envelope
Populated places in Southern District (Israel)
1949 establishments in Israel